Sir Gamaliel Capell (1561–1613), of Rookwood Hall in the parish of Abbess Roding in Essex served as a Member of Parliament for the county seat of Essex from 1605 to 1613.

Origins
He was born on 2 January 1561, the 4th son of Henry Capell (c.1537-1588), of Hadham Hall in the parish of Little Hadham, Hertfordshire, and of Rayne in Essex, Sheriff of Essex, Sheriff of Hertfordshire and a Member of Parliament for Hertfordshire. His mother was Katherine Manners, a daughter of Thomas Manners, 1st Earl of Rutland. He was a descendant of Sir William Capel (c.1446-1515) of Capel Court in the parish of 
St Bartholomew-by-the-Exchange in the City of London and of Hadham Hall, Lord Mayor of London.

Marriage & issue

On 6 September 1584 he married Jane Browne (d.1618), a daughter and co-heiress of Wiston Browne of Rookwood Hall in the parish of Abbess Roding in Essex and widow of Edward Wyatt of Tillingham in Essex, by whom he had issue 6 sons and 3 daughters, including:
Gamaliel Capell, eldest son and heir.
Mildred Capell (d.1633), whose mural monument with her bust survives in Abbess Roding Church, wife of Sir William Luckyn, 1st Baronet (1594–1660), of Little Waltham, and mother of Sir Capell Luckyn, 2nd Baronet (1622–1680), whose male descendants (having adopted the surname Grimston) included William Grimston, 1st Viscount Grimston (c.1683–1756) and James Walter Grimston, 1st Earl of Verulam, 4th Viscount Grimston (1775–1845). 

.

Sources
Andrew Thrush, biography of Capell, Sir Gamaliel (1561-1613), of Rookwood Hall, Abbess Roding, Essex, published in History of Parliament: House of Commons 1604-1629, ed. Andrew Thrush and John P. Ferris, 2010

References

1613 deaths
1561 births